Luke Gardiner, 1st Viscount Mountjoy PC (Ire) (7 February 1745 – 5 June 1798) was an Irish landowner and politician.

Biography
He was the son of Charles Gardiner by his wife Florinda, daughter of Robert Norman. His sister Anne later became Countess of Clancarty. On 3 July 1773 he married Elizabeth, daughter of William Montgomery, an MP for Ballynakill and later a Baronet. Their children included a son, Charles John, and a daughter Margaret, who later became Countess of Donoughmore. He was educated at St John's College, Cambridge.

From 1773 to 1789 he represented Dublin County in the Irish House of Commons. He was appointed to the Irish Privy Council on 29 December 1780 and created Baron Mountjoy on 19 September 1789 and Viscount Mountjoy on 30 September 1795, both in the Peerage of Ireland.

Lord Mountjoy was killed in action at the age of 53, leading his regiment at the Battle of New Ross. He was succeeded by his son Charles, who was later created Earl of Blessington.

References

|-

1745 births
1798 deaths
Gardiner, Luke
Gardiner, Luke
Gardiner, Luke
Alumni of St John's College, Cambridge
Members of the Parliament of Ireland (pre-1801) for County Dublin constituencies
Members of the Privy Council of Ireland
Viscounts in the Peerage of Ireland
Peers of Ireland created by George III